Handl or Händl is a surname. Notable people with the surname include:

Irene Handl (1901–1987), English character actress
Jacobus Handl (1550–1591), late-Renaissance composer
Klaus Händl (born 1969), Austrian actor, director, and writer

See also
Handel (disambiguation)